"Poke It Out" is a song by American rapper Wale featuring American rapper J. Cole. It was released on September 30, 2021, as the third single from Wale's seventh studio album Folarin II (2021). The song was produced by Cool & Dre and samples "Vivrant Thing" by Q-Tip.

Composition and lyrics
Over the electric bass sample, Wale raps the chorus and first verse, about his relationship with women ("I just wanna see if you gon' lie or you gon' love me / I was gettin' broads way before I got the money, honey"). In the second verse, J. Cole celebrates his reunion with Wale ("Cole World and Folarin co-starrin' / We both flexin', Bo Jacksons, bogartin'"), also rapping about the attention he receives from women and being the "franchise player".

Music video
The official music video was released on September 30, 2021. In it, Wale drives a red Jeep with a group of women. A beach run scene from the video for "Vivrant Thing" is recreated, when Wale and the female models end up at a lakeside campsite, where the women play football and dance and Wale hosts a bonfire. J. Cole later appears, rapping in a pink lit room.

Charts

Weekly charts

Year-end charts

References

2021 singles
2021 songs
Wale (rapper) songs
J. Cole songs
Songs written by Wale (rapper)
Songs written by J. Cole
Song recordings produced by Cool & Dre
Maybach Music Group singles
Warner Records singles